Lote may refer to:

Places
Lote, Norway, a village in Eid municipality, Sogn og Fjordane, Norway
Lote, India, an area in the Ratnagiri district of Maharashtra

People
Denis Kiwanuka Lote (1938–2022), Ugandan Roman Catholic prelate, Archbishop of the Roman Catholic Archdiocese of Tororo
Lote Raikabula (born 1983), a New Zealand Rugby union player
Lote Tuipulotu (born 1987), American professional rugby union player
Lote Tuqiri (born 1979), former professional dual-code rugby footballer who primarily played as a winger across both codes
Lote Tuqiri (rugby union, born 1987) (born 1987), Japan international rugby union sevens player
Thomas Lote (MP fl. 1363), English politician and brewer
Thomas Lote (MP fl. 1380–1390), English politician from Chippenham

Other
Lote tree (disambiguation)
Lote language, an Austronesian language spoken around Cape Dampier in Papua New Guinea
Languages Other Than English, LOTE is a frequently used acronym in Australia and New York
Living on the Edge (disambiguation)

See also

Lota (name)
Lotus (disambiguation)
FK Ohrid Lote, a football club from the city of Ohrid, Macedonia